Joaquín Ascaso Budria (Zaragoza, c. 1906/1907 – Caracas, March 1977) was an anarcho-syndicalist and President of the Regional Defence Council of Aragon between 1936 and 1937.

Personal life 
He was a cousin of CNT leader Francisco Ascaso.

See also
11th Division
Domingo Ascaso Abadía (cousin)
Francisco Ascaso (cousin)

References

Further reading 

.
.
.

1900s births
1977 deaths
Spanish anarchists
Stubs
Death in Caracas